The British Independent Film Awards 2021 were held on 5 December 2021 to recognise the best in British independent cinema and filmmaking talent from United Kingdom. The nominations were announced on 3 November 2021, by actors Samuel Adewunmi and Mimi Keene via live-stream from the Curzon Soho in London.

The winners of the craft categories were announced on 19 November while the winners for the rest of the categories were presented at the ceremony on 5 December. The awards were hosted by Asim Chaudhry.

Winners and nominees

Films with multiple nominations and awards

References

External links
Official website

British Independent Film Awards
2021 film awards
2021 in the United Kingdom